Hymenandra is a genus of flowering plants belonging to the family Primulaceae.

Its native range is Assam to Southern Central China and Western Malesia, Central America to Colombia.

Species:

Hymenandra acutissima 
Hymenandra beamanii 
Hymenandra calcicola 
Hymenandra callejasii 
Hymenandra calycosa 
Hymenandra crosbyi 
Hymenandra diamphidia 
Hymenandra iteophylla 
Hymenandra lilacina 
Hymenandra narayanaswamii 
Hymenandra pittieri 
Hymenandra rosea 
Hymenandra sordida 
Hymenandra squamata 
Hymenandra stenophylla 
Hymenandra wallichii

References

Primulaceae
Primulaceae genera